The Studio Museum in Harlem is an American art museum devoted to the work of artists of African descent. The museum's galleries are currently closed in preparation for a building project that will replace the current building, located at 144 West 125th Street between Adam Clayton Powell Jr. Boulevard and Lenox Avenue in Harlem, Manhattan, New York City, with a new one on the same site. Founded in 1968, the museum collects, preserves and interprets art created by African Americans, members of the African diaspora, and artists from the African continent. Its scope includes exhibitions, artists-in-residence programs, educational and public programming, and a permanent collection.

Since opening in a rented loft at Fifth Avenue and 125th Street, the Studio Museum has earned recognition for its role in promoting the works of artists of African descent. The museum's Artist-in-Residence program has supported over one hundred graduates who have gone on to highly regarded careers. A wide variety of educational and public programs include lectures, dialogues, panel discussions and performances, as well as interpretive programs, both on- and off-site, for students and teachers. The exhibitions program has also expanded the scope of art historical literature through the production of scholarly catalogues, brochures, and pamphlets.

History

The idea that became the Studio Museum was developed by a diverse group of founders in the belief that the African-American community should include a museum as part of its everyday experience, and to reflect their interests. Opened in 1968, in a rented loft, the Studio Museum in Harlem moved to its present location in 1982, where it focuses on exhibiting works by both emerging and established artists of African descent.

The museum celebrated the opening in September 1968 of its first exhibition, Electronic Reflections II, featuring works by artist Tom Lloyd. The museum's first director was Charles Inniss. Directors since that time have been Edward Spriggs, Courtney Callender, Mary Schmidt Campbell, Kinshasha Holman Conwill, Lowery Stokes Sims, and Thelma Golden, its current director.
From 1970 - 1978, Gylbert Coker, the first chief curator of the museum set up the registration system for the SMH art collection which was later housed in The State Office Building. She arranged for the saving and cleaning of the Works Progress Administration Federal Art Project murals in Harlem Hospital that were done by Charles Alston. She curated several major exhibitions, among them, Bob Thompson (which revitalized the recognition of Thompson's art work), Hale Woodruff:50 years of His Art, and Contemporary African American Photographers.

Originally, the museum focused on workshops and exhibition programs that were designed to give artists a space to practice their craft, create works and show them. This idea led the trustees of the museum to start an Artist-in-Residence program. The proposal for the studio component of the museum was then written by the African-American painter William T. Williams, who believed it was important to have black artists working in the Harlem community, and also exhibiting their work in that community. Williams and sculptor Mel Edwards physically cleaned up and prepared the former industrial loft space at the museum's original location at 2033 Fifth Avenue (at 125th Street) for conversion into artists studios. The first artist to work in the top floor studio space was printmaker and sculptor Valerie Maynard.

The museum also maintains an education department; in the 1970s, artists Janet Henry and Carrie Mae Weems worked in the Education Department.

In 2001, architects Rogers Marvel Architects designed the building's entry pavilion, exhibition spaces and auditorium, as well as other facilities.

The museum's Artist-in-Residence program celebrated its 40th year in 2010.  It has helped to cultivate the art-making practices and careers of more than one hundred artists, and the museum has fostered the careers of numerous museum professionals as well.

Former Associate Curator Naima Keith, now deputy director of the California African-American Museum, created many new exhibitions during her tenure, including ones focused on Afrofuturism.

In 2015 award-winning architect David Adjaye — whose firm Adjaye Associates designed the Smithsonian Institution's National Museum of African American History and Culture — was commissioned to design a new home for the Studio Museum in Harlem, which will allow the museum to expand its exhibition schedule.

Artist-in-Residence program
Each year, the Studio Museum offers an 11-month studio residency for three local, national, or international emerging artists working in any media. Each artist is granted a free non-living studio space and a stipend. Artists have access to the museum's studios and are expected to work in the studio a minimum of 20 hours per week and participate in open studios and public programs. At the end of the residency, an exhibition of the artists’ work is presented in the museum's galleries.

Selected former artists in residence:

Kehinde Wiley, 2001–02
Mequitta Ahuja, 2009–10
Njideka Akunyili, 2011–12
Sadie Barnette, 2014–15
Kevin Beasley, 2013–14
Jordan Casteel, 2015–16
June Clark (artist), 1996–1997
Gregory Coates, 1996–97
Bethany Collins, 2013–14
Abigail DeVille, 2013–14
Lauren Halsey, 2014–15
Allison Janae Hamilton, 2018–19
EJ Hill, 2015–16
Jibade-Khalil Huffman, 2015–16
Texas Isaiah, 2020–2021
Steffani Jemison, 2012–13
Lauren Kelley, 2009–10
Autumn Knight, 2016–17
Simone Leigh, 2010–11
Eric N. Mack, 2014–15
Meleko Mokgosi, 2011–12
Sana Musasama, 1983–84
Marilyn Nance, 1993–94
Jennifer Packer, 2012–13
Kamau Amu Patton, 2010–11
Julia Phillips, 2016–17
Valerie Piraino, 2009–10
Elliot Reed, 2019–2020
Tanea Richardson, 2007–08
Andy Robert, 2016–17
Jacolby Satterwhite, 2020–2021
Tschabalala Self, 2018–19
Paul Mpagi Sepuya, 2010–11
Xaviera Simmons, 2011–12
Sable Elyse Smith, 2018–19
Cullen Washington, Jr., 2012–13

Collection
The Studio Museum's permanent collection contains approximately 2000 works, including drawings, pastels, prints, photographs, mixed-media works and installations. It comprises works created by artists during their residencies, as well as pieces given to the museum to create a historical framework for artists of African descent. Featured in the collection are Terry Adkins, Laylah Ali, Romare Bearden, Dawoud Bey, Skunder Boghossian, Frederick J. Brown, Elizabeth Catlett, Robert Colescott, Gregory Coates, Melvin Edwards, Kira Lynn Harris, Richard Hunt, Hector Hyppolite, Serge Jolimeau, Lois Mailou Jones, Jacob Lawrence, Norman Lewis, Wardell Milan, Philome Obin, Howardena Pindell, Betye Saar, Nari Ward, and Hale Woodruff, among others. The museum is also the custodian of an extensive archive of the work of photographer James VanDerZee, the noted chronicler of the Harlem community during the 1920s, 30s, and 40s. In 1985 the museum was the recipient of the Award of Merit from the Municipal Art Society of New York City in recognition of its outstanding Black art collection.

See also
List of African-American firsts
List of museums focused on African Americans
List of museums and cultural institutions in New York City

References

External links

 Studio Museum in Harlem official website.
 The Studio Museum in Harlem at Google Cultural Institute

Harlem
African-American museums in New York City
Museums in Manhattan
Art museums and galleries in New York City
Art museums established in 1968
1968 establishments in New York City
African-American arts organizations